The Black Donnellys is an American drama television series that debuted on NBC on February 26, 2007, and last aired on May 14, 2007. Thereafter, NBC began releasing new episodes weekly on NBC.com until the series was canceled. The Black Donnellys was created by Paul Haggis and Robert Moresco featured in the cast Jonathan Tucker, Olivia Wilde, Billy Lush, Tom Guiry, Kirk Acevedo, and relative newcomers Michael Stahl-David and Keith Nobbs.

The series follows four young Roman Catholic Irish-American brothers in New York City's Hell's Kitchen neighborhood and their involvement with petty and organized crime, specifically the Irish Mob.  Set in the present day, the show draws heavily upon Irish-American history and iconic themes. The pilot episode illustrates a clear tension and rivalry between Irish and Italians. The episodes are narrated by a childhood friend, Joey "Ice Cream", whom the show depicts as an unreliable narrator.

In creating the show, Haggis, a native of London, Ontario, strongly referenced his hometown's local history about the real-life Black Donnellys and the massacre associated with their name. In the pilot episode, Joey says the neighborhood is populated primarily by "Black Irish", whom he calls "a race of dark-haired people" the Celts had failed to wipe out in Ireland. Hell's Kitchen in the series is also a fairly faithful depiction—a traditionally working-class neighborhood with a deeply entrenched ethnic Irish population and an Irish Mob with control over illegal gambling and loansharking, and heavy involvement in the unions.

On May 14, 2007, the series was canceled by NBC. On June 5, 2007, it was announced that HDNet had acquired the rights from NBC Universal to broadcast all 13 episodes of the series, beginning June 13, 2007. A DVD collection entitled "The Black Donnellys: The Complete Series" was released on September 4, 2007.

Characters
 James "Jimmy" Donnelly (Tom Guiry) – The oldest of 4 brothers, Jimmy is a troublemaker and drug user, often involved in criminal activity, and known for making stupid decisions. He walks with a permanent limp, incurred when a speeding, runaway car crushed his leg, when he was young.  (Jimmy does not know who was driving the car; only Joey Ice Cream and Tommy know that it was actually little Tommy.) Jimmy believes he should be the leader of the Donnelly brothers, but his constant temper flare-ups cause people to believe him incapable of leadership, so they follow Tommy. This constant battle for being in charge causes friction between the two brothers throughout the season.
 Thomas "Tommy" Donnelly (Jonathan Tucker) – Tommy is the second oldest brother in the Donnelly family. He is known to step up as the leader of the four brothers and often cleans up his brothers' trouble-making messes. His care-taking nature stems from an incident in childhood when he ran over his brother Jimmy's leg after stealing a car. He promised God that if Jimmy walked again, he, Tommy, would take care of him thereafter.  Tommy wants to become an artist, and has been going to art school. Huey Farrell, the boss of the Irish Mob, had been paying for his tuition. When Huey dies, the money is revoked by Huey's brother Dokey Farrell, who suspects Tommy of killing his brother. Tommy is in love with Jenny Reilly, a childhood friend with whom he has a complicated and strained relationship.  He struggles between taking care of his family and doing what he wants.
 Kevin Donnelly (Billy Lush) – Kevin is the second youngest of the Donnelly brothers.  He is a gambler whose gut instincts are extremely lucky. The problem is, he never follows his gut. He doubts every bet that he makes, and therefore loses every bet except one: the only bet he has won in his entire life occurred the day before his father died, when he asked Kevin to pick a horse to bet on in a horse race. The horse won, and as it was the last thing his father did with him, it caused Kevin to believe he is lucky. His gambling debt to Louie Downtown created the chain of events that lead to the season finale.  Kevin is often caught between helping Tommy and Jimmy. He is very loyal to his brothers and is much more of a follower than a leader.
 Sean "Seanny" Donnelly (Michael Stahl-David) – Seanny is the youngest of the brothers and is noted for his popularity with women.  In the season premiere, Sean is severely beaten by Nicky Cottero in reaction to Jimmy's kidnapping of Louie Downtown. Sean would like to help his brothers with "business", but they try to keep him out of the loop to keep him safe.
 Samson Dawlish (James Badge Dale) – A suitor of Jenny's who becomes obsessed. He works for a delivery service that serves Reilly's diner, and makes a point of delivering extra food for Jenny free of charge.
 Robert "Bobby" Donnelly (John Bolger) – Bobby is the Donnelly brothers' deceased father. He and Huey were the bosses of the Irish neighborhood when the Donnelly brothers were kids, though Bobby was the head of the union local, a position that earned significant respect for himself and his family.

 Helen Donnelly (Kate Mulgrew) – Helen is the Donnelly brothers' widowed mother. She watches out the most for young Sean, but she fiercely defends all her sons and turns a blind eye to their acts of revenge.  While the boys feel she needs protecting, she gives hints of being much more capable and streetwise than they would ever guess.
 Joey "Ice Cream" (Keith Nobbs) – Joey is the jailhouse narrator and a lifelong friend of the brothers. He is typically willing to help them out in their times of need.  Something of a Scheherezade figure, he is a classic example of an unreliable narrator, revising his story frequently when called on iffy details.
 Jenny Reilly (Olivia Wilde) – A childhood friend of Tommy and rest of the Donnelly boys', Jenny runs a local diner with her father.  She and Tommy have a complicated and strained relationship. Jenny married a schoolteacher who, unbeknownst to her, stole from drug dealers to pay his student loans and ended up stuffed in an oil drum. No one has the heart to tell Jenny.
 Nicky Cottero (Kirk Acevedo) – Nicky is an Italian gangster currently attempting to take over the area formerly controlled by his mentor, Sal. He befriends the Donnellys to try to take down both Dokey and Alo.
 Derek Timothy "Dokey" Farrell (Peter Greene) –  Dokey is an Irish gangster who controls his deceased older brother's turf. He gained the nickname Dokey while growing up and being reportedly "The King of the Hokey Pokey" = "Hokey-Pokey Dokey". He is known for carrying an axe and chopping off people's toes. He wants more than anything to gain the prestige and respect his brother had, but has trouble putting up with the aggression of the Italians and the wayward ways of the Donnellys.
 Hugh William "Huey" Farrell (Chris Bauer) – Huey is an Irish gangster who formerly controlled the Irish neighborhood.  He was killed in the pilot episode.
 Louie Downtown (Joe D'Onofrio) – Louie Downtown is a low level bookie who doesn't mean anything to anyone, except that he's the nephew of the Italian mob boss Sal Minetta. Louie is  kidnapped by Jimmy, Kevin, and Sean because Kevin owes him money. They hold Louie for ransom to the Italians, but when the Italians discover the Donnelly brothers are behind the kidnapping, Nicky Cottero severely beats Sean. In response to the attack, Jimmy shoots Louie to death.
 Joanie (Betsy Beutler) – Joanie is Jimmy's drug addicted girlfriend. She seems to want a better life for herself and Jimmy but frequently backslides. She cheats on Jimmy with Whitey. When Jimmy finds out, he kills Whitey.
 Nadine (Jamie Bonelli) – Nadine is Sean's love interest.  She met Sean while selling him and Jimmy a jukebox for The Firecracker.  She is helping Sean study for his GED.
 Terrance "Whitey" Waylon (Kevin Corrigan) – Whitey is Bob the Mouth's nephew and Jimmy's business partner. Jimmy stabs him to death after discovering Whitey has been sleeping with Joanie and out of fear that he may have given up information to the police or Dokey.
 Robert "Bob the Mouth" Kelly (Peter Gerety) – Bob is a neighborhood bookie and Terrance "Whitey" Waylon's uncle. He frequently "solves" his problems with a grill iron. Jimmy owes him money through Whitey.
 Councilman Jack Trevor – Jack is the neighborhood's representative in the New York City Council. He is originally from the neighborhood and was cozy with Huey and Bobby Donnelly back in the day. He helped orchestrate Sal and Huey's real estate scheme and is having an affair with his chief of staff, Trish Hughes.
 Detective Frank Stein (Ned Eisenberg) – Frank is a NYPD detective at the 28th Precinct. He arrests Jimmy for armed robbery in the pilot episode and is tasked with the Huey-Sal homicide case in the following episode. Unlike his colleague, Det. Geckel, he is not on Dokey's payroll, and it is implied he has been trying to build a case against the Irish Mob for a long time.

Cast

Main

Recurring

Episodes

Home media

International broadcasters

References

External links

 The Black Donnellys  at NBC.com
 The Black Donnellys Reviews at Metacritic
 

NBC original programming
2007 American television series debuts
2007 American television series endings
2000s American drama television series
Serial drama television series
Television series created by Paul Haggis
Television series by Universal Television
Irish-American mass media
Television shows set in New York City
Television series about brothers
Television series about organized crime
Works about Irish-American organized crime